The following is a list of Horrid Henry episodes.

Seasons overview

Episodes

Season 1 (2006–2007)

Season 2 (2009–2010)

Season 3 (2011–2012)

Season 4 (2014–2015)

Season 5 (2018–2019)
In May 2018, a fifth season was commissioned by Novel Entertainment with another 42 episodes, 10 less than the previous 4 series, making it 250. Netflix premiered the first 12 episodes on 15 December 2018, then 10 more episodes premiered on 14 January 2019, followed with the rest of the season on 17 May 2019. A screening of 3 new episodes was hosted by Dick and Dom in a BAFTA Kids preview at the Princess Anne Royal Theatre, London on 17 November 2018. Another screening of 3 new episodes took place in a BFI Funday TV Preview on 17 February 2019.

Specials (2019-2023) 
In September 2020, it was announced that Novel would be producing new 1-hour specials of Horrid Henry for Netflix, after the successful launch of Horrid Henry's Wild Weekend.

See also

Horrid Henry
Horrid Henry: The Movie

References

External links
 Horrid Henry UK website
 Horrid Henry website 

Horrid Henry (TV series) episodes
Horrid Henry (TV series) episodes